Ejection or Eject may refer to:

 Ejection (sports), the act of officially removing someone from a game
 Eject (Transformers), a fictional character from The Transformers television series
 "Eject" (song), 1993 rap rock single by Senser
 The usage of an Ejection seat by a pilot in an aircraft
 Eject, a 2014 album by Cazzette

See also
 
 Ejecta (disambiguation)
 Ejector (disambiguation)
 Coronal mass ejection, an ejection of material from a sun's corona
 Ejection fraction, the fraction of blood pumped with each heart beat
 Great Ejection, an event in England in 1662 when non-conforming ministers lost their positions